Fitz Houston aka Fitzhugh G. Houston was born June 9, 1953 and is an actor, musician, author and pastor. As an actor, he played the part of Principal Gordon in Sister, Sister. He appeared in an episode of Sugar and Spice,  also  The Reverse Peephole, which was an episode of Seinfield  and Trust No 1 which was an episode of The X-Files.

Acting career

1970s to 1980s
One of Houston's earliest film roles was in the 1979 film Disco Godfather which was directed by  J Robert Wagoner and starred Rudy Ray Moore. He appeared in a couple of episodes of Knight Rider in 1982 and 1983. One of the roles was as an assembly speaker.  He played the part of Det. Gilbert in the 1986 slasher film Sorority House Massacre which was directed by Carol Frank and produced by Roger Corman. Houston appeared in the 1988 film Night of the Kickfighters which was directed by Buddy Reyes and starred Adam West. This was a film about a group of martial artists who take on a terrorist group who are holding a secret weapon.  Houston's character  Socrates was part of a team that included a gadget man Bomber (played by Michelangelo Kowalski), Clea a computer expert (played by Phyllis Doyle), and Aldo a stage musician (played by Philip Dore).

1990s
Houston played the part of Tony North in the Jean-Paul Ouellette directed 1990 action film Chinatown Connection which starred Lee Majors II and brucesploitation actor Bruce Ly. This was a film about two cops trying to find the source of poisoned cocaine. The Tony North character was a menacing and slick villain. He was the cartel enforcer, and he was also the one behind the poisoning of the narcotics. Fist of B-List in their review of the film likened him to as a cross between Predator-era Carl Weathers with muscles and former pro-wrestler, Norman Smiley great polo shirts and Norman Smiley.

Houston wanted to get into the field of voice acting and he got the part of Mr. Bones in the 1996 video game Mr. Bones. Houston had some freedom his own ideas into the mix and he drew from the character George "Kingfish" Stevens which had been played by actor Tim Moore. Certain aspects of Houston's actual facial features were incorporated into the video characters emotion expression. Houston's lines were recorded at Sega Studios and he recorded a song "In This World" with Ronnie Montrose.

In 1998, he played a cop in an episode of Seinfeld, The Reverse Peephole, which aired on 1/8/98.

2000s
He played the role of Melvin in the 2007 film Rich in Spirit which was directed by Cora Anne. It was a comedy about a preacher who has a belief that anyone can have a good life if they work hard for it. His belief is challenged when one day he switches body with a homeless man. Karen Andrade and Marquis Henderson also starred in the film.

The Eric Darnell Redding directed film, A Fatal Friend was released in 2015. He played the part of Captain Hunt.
He appeared in the "Greg and Larry" episode of Brooklyn Nine-Nine. The episode also featured Dennis Haysbert, Tisha French and Kristin Hensley aired in 2016. He played the part of Pastor Fredricks in Eric Darnell Redding 2016 made-for-television movie, Hollywood Fiction which also starred Audi Resendez and Noah Staggs.

In 2018, Houston appeared in the Matthew Charles Santoro directed sci-fi film, Higher Power.

Filmography (selective)

Television shows

Films

Video games

Publications

References

External links
 Imdb: Fitz Houston
 Website

Living people
1950 births
African-American male actors
American male film actors
American male television actors
American television producers
Flugelhorn players
American Christian clergy
21st-century African-American people
20th-century African-American people